is a passenger railway station in the city of Ōzu, Ehime Prefecture, Japan. It is operated by JR Shikoku and has the station number "S11".

Lines
Only local trains stop at the station. Connections with other services are needed to travel further east of Matsuyama on the line.

Layout
The station consists of a side platform serving a single track on a sidehill cut. There is no station building, only a shelter for waiting passengers. A steep flight of steps leads up to the station from the main road. A toilet building is located at the base of the steps and there is limited parking. A siding branches off the track and leads to a disused freight platform. There are also traces of trackbed on the other side of the passenger platform, indicating that it was once an island serving two tracks.

History
At that time the station was operated by Japanese Government Railways (JGR), later becoming Japanese National Railways (JNR). With the privatization of JNR on 1 April 1987, the station came under the control of JR Shikoku.

Surrounding area
This station is on the border of Iyo and Ozu cities, and the city border runs through the middle of the platform. The sea can be clearly seen from the platform, and the coast can be reached just by walking for a few minutes from the station.

See also
 List of railway stations in Japan

References

External links
Station timetable

Railway stations in Ehime Prefecture
Railway stations in Japan opened in 1935
Ōzu, Ehime